Lieve Maes (born 12 May 1960, in Brussels) is a Belgian politician and is affiliated to the N-VA. She was elected as a member of the Belgian Senate in 2010.

In March 2015 Lieve Maes made headlines in her unrelentless fight against the oppression of the Flemish people, by lamenting the lack of announcements in Dutch when flights serviced by British Airways land at the international airport of Brussels.

Notes

Living people
Members of the Senate (Belgium)
New Flemish Alliance politicians
1960 births
Politicians from Brussels
People's Union (Belgium) politicians
21st-century Belgian politicians
21st-century Belgian women politicians